MG132 is a potent, reversible, and cell-permeable proteasome inhibitor (Ki = 4 nM). It belongs to the class of synthetic peptide aldehydes. It reduces the degradation of ubiquitin-conjugated proteins in mammalian cells and permeable strains of yeast by the 26S complex without affecting its ATPase or isopeptidase activities. MG132 activates c-Jun N-terminal kinase (JNK1), which initiates apoptosis. MG132 also inhibits NF-κB activation with an IC50 of 3 μM and prevents β-secretase cleavage.

Molecular mechanism 
There are several inhibitors that can readily enter cell and selectively inhibit degradative pathway. It includes peptide aldehydes, such as Cbz-leu-leu-leucinal (MG132), Cbz-leu-leu-norvalinal (MG115) and acetyl-leu-leu-norleucinal (ALLN). These are substrate analogues and potent transition-state inhibitors of chymotrypsin like activity of proteasome machinery. The peptide aldehydes are also known to inhibit certain lysosomal cysteine proteases and the calpains hence MG132 may not be exclusive inhibitor of proteasomal pathway.

References

External links 

 Proeasome inhibitors review

Peptides
Proteasome inhibitors
Aldehydes
Carbamates